William Allen High School is one of two large, urban public high schools of the Allentown School District in Allentown, Pennsylvania. The school provides public education for grades 9 through 12. William Allen High School is located at 106 North 17th Street, Allentown. It serves students from the center city and west side sections of Allentown. The city's other public high school, Dieruff High School, serves students from Allentown's eastern and southern sections. Until Dieruff's opening in 1959, William Allen High School was known as Allentown High School. 

As of the 2020-21 school year, the school had an enrollment of 2,801 students, according to National Center for Education Statistics data.

High school students may choose to attend Lehigh Career and Technical Institute for vocational training in the trades. The Carbon-Lehigh Intermediate Unit IU21 provides the Allentown School District with a wide variety of services like specialized education for disabled students and hearing, speech and visual disability services and professional development for staff and faculty. In 2015, the school district opened Building 21 Allentown as an experimental high school which focuses on building passion among students through career exploration.

History

Origins

 

William Allen High School was established in 1858 by R. W. McAlpine, who took a group of 14 older students to the Garber-Horne Building, formerly the home of the North American Homeopathic School of Healing Arts at South Penn Street, near the present Allentown School District Administration Building. 
This was the beginning of what was then called Allentown High School, a name it retained until 1858. Primary and secondary education originally were both taught in the school. The first class was fourteen pupils, equally divided by boys and girls.

In 1859, by a vote of 6 to 2, a separate high school was established, one for boys and one for girls. The second school was located at the Presbyterian Sunday School. Augustus Armagnac was named teacher for the male students, and Hannah L. Romig for the female students.  The first commencement was held in May 1869 in the Presbyterian Church on North Fifth Street and included three students.

During the period 1859 to 1894 secondary school classes were held separately for boys and girls. The classes for boys were held in the Leh's store building on Hamilton Street, and the girl's classes were held in the Sunday School rooms of the First Presbyterian Church on North Fifth Street.  Classes were transferred to the Fourth Ward Wolf Building from 1880 to 1894 and were moved again in 1895 to a new building built exclusively as a high school at the site of the "Old Central School" at Lumber and Turner streets. However, this school became overcrowded with students. In 1913, five rooms of the Herbst School Building were used for the freshman class of 1918.

Allentown High School
In 1917, the current main building of the school at 17th and Turner was completed, and Allentown High School was moved and consolidated into its current building. Until 1928, the school provided education for students in grades 9 through 12.

Allentown High School began its football program in 1896. But the team did not have a designated practice field and used any instead used any open field that was available. On September 26, 1928, A. Jack Coffield, an Allentown High School football player died during a football practice. The following year, in September 1929, the A. Jack Coffield Stadium was opened west of the main building in Coffield's honor. The 15,000 seat capacity Coffield Stadium was the first permanent home for the Allentown High School football team. Over a six-year period, from 1941 to 1946, the Allentown High School team went 60-3-3, outscoring the opposition 1,801 points to 239. Forty of Allentown High School's sixty wins were by shutouts.

The next year, in 1930, the Annex and Little Palestra were built to provide additional classroom space and an indoor gymnasium and swimming instruction.  After World War II, additional expansion was made with the acquisition of the Mack and Farr buildings, which were located across Seventeenth Street on the South Side of Linden. These were two late Nineteenth Century Victorian homes.  The Mack building was used for Business Education classes,  while the Farr building taught various home economic classes. The Hunsicker Building, located in the 300 Block of North Sixth Street, was used for Honors classes;  the Nineteenth Street machine-welding shop was leased by the ASD for Industrial Arts training.

In 1948, Coffield Stadium was replaced by the larger Allentown School District Stadium. The Coffield facility became an athletic field for the high school until 1971.  In 1949, the Vocational Annex, called the St. Cloud Street building was opened which provided room for masonry and auto body repair training.  Those classes were moved in 1957 to the new Brick and Auto Body building was opened at the location of the unused Coffield site, which the seats were removed in 1955 to be the visitor's stand on south side of the ASD stadium along Linden Street.   The St. Cloud building was then used for several chemistry labs.   Also in 1957, the Linden Street Wing was opened on part of the old Coffield site with the Hunsicker and the Nineteenth Street machine-welding shop classes being moved into it, along with additional classroom space.

William Allen High School
With the opening of Louis E. Dieruff High School in East Allentown in 1959,  students basically living east of Seventh Street were assigned to the new high school. The students living west of Seventh Street remained assigned to Allentown High School. It was renamed William Allen High School on June 1, 1960 to honor William Allen, who was the Chief Justice of the Province of Pennsylvania and former mayor of Philadelphia. He founded the city of Allentown, Pennsylvania in 1762.

In 1972 the Mack and Farr buildings were closed and torn down the next year.  Also that year the Coffield athletic field was redeveloped and the new William Allen High School gymnasium/natatorium was erected on the site. In 1975, a Library-Science Center was built on the site of the Little Palestra that was torn down in 1973.

The Coffield Stadium seats that were moved to the ASD stadium in 1955 were torn down in 2002 as part of the renovation of J. Birney Crum Stadium.   In 2010 a new 9th grade center was built on the former St. Cloud Building site, at the corner of Linden and St. Cloud streets.  It was then dedicated as the "Clifford S. Bartholomew Building".

In 2010 and 2011, the largest and most expensive renovation in the schools' history took place to 7 other campus buildings.  These renovations were made while maintaining the architectural features in the older structures.   All of the remaining buildings were gutted, and each one receiving new; walls, ceilings, floors, windows, paint, doors/ stairwells, and air conditioning throughout all 7 buildings. New dance studios were constructed on the first floor of the Annex Building 2 with proper floors/mats.  Art rooms, chorus and band facilities, were constructed in the Linden Building 6 and 7. Art Labs were equipped with proper tables, lighting and tech. In the other buildings, renovations include, up graded science lab equipment, new tables in the cafeterias, a multimedia center, and upgrades in the black box theater, and hundreds of new and refurbished class room spaces, also, elevators were put in buildings that were without and accessible facilities were created for the disabled.

As part of this major renovation, $1 million was spent on the auditorium. "To give students access to the most advanced stage equipment and to restore it to the beauty and class it exhibited when it was first built." From new curtains, new seating, and restoration done to the imported Stretched Oil on Canvas Portrait situated above the stage. Along with restoration to historic plaster work that adorns the walls and ceilings. A 15 ft stage extension was also built. Lighting and sound upgrades consist of a "state of the art" ETC Lighting Console along with 2 dimming cabinets and 20 led color changing border light alternatives,  and, a Custom integrated Simple and Front of House sound system with an independently dedicated SFX system and Yamaha Ls9 console with iPad for remote mixing. As one patron said, "Parkland may have a nice theater, but this is class."

In all the William Allen Campus is finally equipped to provide students with a proper 21st century education in the schools Academic and Arts Academies of Study.

Athletics

William Allen is one of 18 large high schools that compete in the Eastern Pennsylvania Conference, one of the nation's premier high school athletic divisions. The school plays its home football and some of its soccer games at J. Birney Crum Stadium, a 15,000 capacity stadium in Allentown. Most of its indoor athletics are played in the school's J. Milo Sewards Gymnasium. The school's primary athletic rivalry is with cross-town Dieruff High School.

Athletic honors

Boys basketball
 2016-2017:
 First place, East Pennsylvania Conference Boys Basketball
2010–2011:
PIAA District XI AAAA Boys Basketball Champions (18th time).
2009–2010:
Second place, Lehigh Valley Conference Boys Basketball
2007–2008:
PIAA District XI AAAA Girls Basketball Champions.
2005–2006:
First place, Lehigh Valley Conference Boys Basketball (26th time).
PIAA District XI AAAA Boys Basketball Champions (17th time).
2003:
Second place, PIAA District XI AAAA Boys Basketball.
2002:
First place, PIAA District XI AAAA Boys Basketball.
Historical:
Five-time Pennsylvania State Boys Basketball Tournament Champions.
One-time Pennsylvania State Girls Basketball Tournament Champions.
7th in Pennsylvania History for all time Boys Basketball wins 1,588

Football
520 overall wins
21 Conference Championships
District 11 champions 1992
Eight undefeated teams (1929, 1930, 1931, 1941, 1944, 1946, 1953, and 1957).

Arts
The William Allen Theater Department performs an annual fall drama and spring musical.

Pennsylvania ValleyDawgs
The Pennsylvania ValleyDawgs, a member of the now defunct United States Basketball League, played their home games in William Allen's gymnasium for the totality of the league's existence from 1999 to 2006.

Alma mater
William Allen High School's alma mater was written by Dorothy Newhard Knoff in 1912, and was set to music composed by Dr. Warren F. Acker in 1900.

All hail our Alma Mater dear,
Our voice of praise and glory hear
To whom all reverence we bear,
Of you forgetful we'll be ne'er.
We shall forever for you yearn
And cherish all that we may learn
Through future days of life,
'Mid joy and strife;
True may we stand, both to you
And Canary and Blue.

Throughout the land of you we'll sing,
Loud will our praises ever ring,
Of days that have passed by,
Fond memories of dear old high.
Oh Alma Mater, hear our praise;
To you all honor we do raise;
Through future days of life,
'mid joy and strife;
True may we stand, both to you
And Canary and Blue.

Notable alumni
Thom Browne, fashion designer
Charlie Dent, former U.S. Congressman
Stanley Dziedzic, 1976 Olympic wrestling bronze medal winner and three-time NCAA Division I college wrestling champion
Anna Mae Hays, first female U.S. Army General
Bob Heffner, former professional baseball player, Boston Red Sox, California Angels, and Cleveland Indians 
Nate Hobgood-Chittick, former professional football player, Indianapolis Colts, Kansas City Chiefs, New York Giants, San Francisco 49ers, and St. Louis Rams
Laurel Hurley, former Metropolitan Opera soprano
Lee Iacocca, former chairman of Chrysler
Guy Kratzer, former Pennsylvania state senator
Marsha I. Lester, physical chemistry professor at University of Pennsylvania
Norton Lewis Lichtenwalner, former U.S. Congressman
Tyrese Martin, professional basketball player, Atlanta Hawks
Michael McDonald, costume designer, 2009 Tony Award, and Drama Desk nominee for Hair
Monk Meyer, former U.S. Army Brigadier General and runner-up for 1935 Heisman Trophy
Lara Jill Miller, actress and voice actress, NBC's Gimme a Break! and Nickelodeon's The Amanda Show
Irene Ng, former actress, Nickelodeon's The Mystery Files of Shelby Woo
Larry Seiple, former professional football player, Miami Dolphins
Amanda Seyfried, actress, Veronica Mars, Big Love, Mamma Mia!, and Les Misérables
Marci Shore, author, historian, and professor, Yale University
Elsie Singmaster, former author
 Donald Voorhees, former American composer and conductor
Joe Wolf, former professional football player, Arizona Cardinals

See also
Allentown School District

References

External links

Official website
Allen High School athletics official website
Allen High School on Facebook
Allen High School on Twitter
Allen High School athletics on Twitter
William Allen High School profile at U.S. News & World Report
William Allen High School profile at Niche
William Allen High School Varsity Football profile at MaxPreps

1858 establishments in Pennsylvania
Educational institutions established in 1858
Public high schools in Pennsylvania
Schools in Allentown, Pennsylvania